Star Wars: Thrawn Ascendancy: Lesser Evil is a Star Wars novel by Timothy Zahn, published on November 16, 2021, by Del Rey Books.

Reception
Sean Keane of CNet called it a "fun Thrawn adventure" but criticized the lack of information revealed about the series villains, Jixtus and the Grysks. The book received the 2022 Dragon Award for "Best Media Tie-In Novel".

See also
 List of Star Wars books, the list of novels published in the Star Wars series

References

Thrawn
Novels based on Star Wars
2021 American novels
2021 science fiction novels
Del Rey books
Novels by Timothy Zahn